The 660th Radar Squadron is an inactive United States Air Force unit. It was last assigned to the 20th NORAD Region (ADTAC), Tactical Air Command, stationed at MacDill AFB, Florida. It was inactivated on 15 November 1980.

The unit was a General Surveillance Radar squadron providing for the air defense of the United States.

Lineage
 Activated as 660th Aircraft Control and Warning Squadron, 5 December 1949
 Inactivated 6 February 1952
 Activated 18 June 1953
 Redesignated 660th Radar Squadron (SAGE), 1 March 1961
 Redesignated 660th Radar Squadron, 1 February 1974
 Inactivated on 15 November 1980

Assignments
 541st Aircraft Control and Warning Group, 5 December 1949 - 6 February 1952
 35th Air Division, 18 June 1953
 32d Air Division, 15 November 1958
 Montgomery Air Defense Sector, 1 November 1959
 32d Air Division, 1 April 1966
 20th Air Division, 19 November 1969 - 15 November 1980

Stations
 Selfridge AFB, Michigan, 5 December 1949 - 6 February 1952
 Dobbins AFB, Georgia, 18 June 1953
 MacDill AFB, Florida, 1 August 1954 – 15 November 1980

References

  Cornett, Lloyd H. and Johnson, Mildred W., A Handbook of Aerospace Defense Organization  1946 - 1980,  Office of History, Aerospace Defense Center, Peterson AFB, CO (1980).
 Winkler, David F. & Webster, Julie L., Searching the Skies, The Legacy of the United States Cold War Defense Radar Program,  US Army Construction Engineering Research Laboratories, Champaign, IL (1997).
 Information for MacDill AFB, FL

External links

Radar squadrons of the United States Air Force
Aerospace Defense Command units